Robert Montgomery (born Henry Montgomery Jr.; May 21, 1904 – September 27, 1981) was an American actor, director, and producer. He began his acting career on the stage, but was soon hired by MGM.  Initially assigned roles in comedies, he soon proved he was able to handle dramatic ones as well. He appeared in a wide variety of roles, such as the weak-willed prisoner Kent in The Big House (1930), the psychotic Danny in Night Must Fall (1937), and Joe, the boxer mistakenly sent to Heaven in Here Comes Mr. Jordan (1941). The last two earned him nominations for the Academy Award for Best Actor.

During World War II, he drove ambulances in France until the Dunkirk evacuation. When the United States entered the war on December 8, 1941, he enlisted in the Navy, and was present at the invasion at Normandy.  After the war, he returned to Hollywood, where he worked in both films and, later, in television. He was also the father of actress Elizabeth Montgomery.

Early life 
Henry Montgomery Jr. was born in Fishkill Landing, New York (now Beacon, New York), to Henry Montgomery and his wife, Mary Weed Montgomery (née Barney), and was of Scottish and Scots-Irish heritage. His father was president of the New York Rubber Company, and committed suicide in 1922 by jumping off the Brooklyn Bridge, when the family's fortune was gone.

Career 

Montgomery settled in New York City to try his hand at writing and acting. He established a stage career, and became popular enough to turn down an offer to appear opposite Vilma Bánky in the film This Is Heaven (1929). Sharing a stage with George Cukor gave him an entry to Hollywood and a contract with Metro-Goldwyn-Mayer, where he debuted in So This Is College (also 1929). One writer claimed that Montgomery was able to establish himself because he "proceeded with confidence, agreeable with everyone, eager and willing to take suggestions". However, author Scott Eyman wrote in 1997 he had an "off-screen reputation as one of the chilliest, most pompous actors ever to find his way to Hollywood."

During the production of So This Is College, Montgomery learned from and questioned crew members from several departments, including sound crew, electricians, set designers, camera crew, and film editors. In a later interview, he confessed, "it showed [him] that making a motion picture is a great co-operative project." So This Is College gained him attention as Hollywood's latest newcomer, and he was put in one production after another, his popularity growing steadily.

Montgomery initially played exclusively in comedy roles; his first dramatic role was in The Big House (1930). MGM was initially reluctant to assign him the role, until "his earnestness, and his convincing arguments, with demonstrations of how he would play the character" won him the assignment. From The Big House on, he was in constant demand. He appeared as Greta Garbo's romantic interest in Inspiration (1930).

Norma Shearer chose him to star opposite her in The Divorcee (1930), Strangers May Kiss (1931), and Private Lives (1931), which led him to stardom. In 1932, Montgomery starred opposite Tallulah Bankhead in Faithless, though the film was not a success.  During this time, Montgomery appeared in the original pre-Code film version of When Ladies Meet (1933), which starred Ann Harding and Myrna Loy. In 1935, Montgomery became president of the Screen Actors Guild, and was elected again in 1946. Montgomery played a psychopathic murderer in the thriller Night Must Fall (1937), for which he was nominated for the Academy Award for Best Actor.

After World War II began in Europe in September 1939, and while the United States was still officially neutral, Montgomery enlisted in London for the American Field Service and drove ambulances in France until the Dunkirk evacuation. He then returned to Hollywood and addressed a massive rally on the MGM lot for the American Red Cross in July 1940.

Montgomery returned to playing light comedy roles, such as Alfred Hitchcock's Mr. & Mrs. Smith (1941) with Carole Lombard. He continued his search for dramatic roles. For his role as Joe Pendleton, a boxer and pilot in Here Comes Mr. Jordan (1941), Montgomery was nominated for an Oscar a second time. After the U.S. entered World War II in December 1941, he joined the United States Navy, rising to the rank of lieutenant commander, and served on the staff of the Commander of Destroyer Squadrons (COMDES) 5 and 60; Commanding Officer PT-107; aboard the light cruiser USS Columbia (CL-56); as an assistant naval attache at the U.S. Embassy, London; and as the Executive Officer of Motor Torpedo Boat 5 (PT-5).

In 1945, Montgomery returned to Hollywood, co-starring and making his uncredited directing debut in They Were Expendable, where he directed some of the PT boat scenes when director John Ford was unable to work for health reasons. Montgomery's first credited film as director and his final film for MGM was the film noir Lady in the Lake (1947), adapted from Raymond Chandler's detective novel, in which he starred as Chandler's most famous character, Phillip Marlowe. It was filmed entirely from Marlowe's vantage point; Montgomery only appeared on camera a few times, three times in a mirror reflection.  He also directed and starred in Ride the Pink Horse (1947), also a film noir.

Active in Republican politics and concerned about communist influence in the entertainment industry, Montgomery was a friendly witness before the House Un-American Activities Committee in 1947. The next year, 1948, Montgomery hosted the Academy Awards. He hosted an Emmy Award-winning television series, Robert Montgomery Presents, which ran from 1950 to 1957. The Gallant Hours (1960), a film Montgomery directed and co-produced with its star, his friend James Cagney, was the last film or television production with which he was connected in any capacity, as actor, director, or producer. In 1955 Montgomery was awarded a Tony Award for his direction of The Desperate Hours.

In 1954, Montgomery took an unpaid position as consultant and coach to President Dwight D. Eisenhower, advising him on how to look his best in his television appearances before the nation. A pioneering media consultant, Montgomery had an office in the White House beginning in 1954.

Montgomery has two stars on the Hollywood Walk of Fame, one for movies at 6440 Hollywood Boulevard, and another for television at 1631 Vine Street.

Personal life and death 

On April 14, 1928, Montgomery married actress Elizabeth Bryan Allen (December 26, 1904 – June 28, 1992), sister of Martha-Bryan Allen. The couple had three children: Martha Bryan, who died at 14 months of age in 1931; Elizabeth (April 15, 1933 – May 18, 1995), an actress best known for her 1960s television series, Bewitched; and Robert Jr. (January 6, 1936 – February 7, 2000). They divorced on December 5, 1950.

His second wife was Elizabeth "Buffy" Grant Harkness (1909–2003), whom he married on December 9, 1950, four days after his divorce from Allen was finalized.

He died of cancer on September 27, 1981, at Columbia-Presbyterian Hospital in Manhattan. His body was cremated and the ashes were given to the family. His two surviving children, Elizabeth and Robert Montgomery Jr., both died of cancer, as well.

Filmography

Television credits

Radio appearances

Notes

References

Further reading 
 Wise, James. Stars in Blue: Movie Actors in America's Sea Services. Annapolis, Maryland: Naval Institute Press, 1997.  .

External links 

 The Earl of Hollywood
 
 
 Robert Montgomery images
 Donald Phelps: The Rich Boy – The Reticent Artistry of Robert Montgomery

1904 births
1981 deaths
American male film actors
American male stage actors
American male television actors
American people of Scottish descent
American people of Scotch-Irish descent
American theatre directors
California Republicans
Deaths from cancer in New York (state)
Eisenhower administration personnel
Film directors from Maine
Film directors from New York (state)
Male actors from New York (state)
Metro-Goldwyn-Mayer contract players
New York (state) Republicans
People from Beacon, New York
People from North Haven, Maine
Presidents of the Screen Actors Guild
Tony Award winners
United States Navy personnel of World War II
United States Navy officers
20th-century American male actors